Brock Faber (born August 22, 2002) is an American ice hockey defenseman for the University of Minnesota. Faber was drafted 45th overall by the Los Angeles Kings in the 2020 NHL Entry Draft and is currently a prospect of the Minnesota Wild.

Playing career
Faber was drafted in the second round, 45th overall, by the Los Angeles Kings in the 2020 NHL Entry Draft. On June 29, 2022, Faber was traded to the Minnesota Wild as part of the deal that sent Kevin Fiala to the Kings.

During the 2020–21 season, his freshman year, Faber recorded one goal and 11 assists in 27 games for Minnesota. Following the season, he was named to the All-Big Ten Freshman Team.

During the 2021–22 season, his sophomore year, Faber recorded two goals and 11 assists in 28 games for Minnesota. Following the season, he was named to the All-Big Ten First Team and was named Big Ten Defensive Player of the Year.

On June 29, 2022, Faber's NHL rights were traded by the Los Angeles Kings, along with a 2022 first-round selection, to the Minnesota Wild in exchange for Kevin Fiala.

International play

Faber represented the United States at the 2021 World Junior Ice Hockey Championships, where he recorded five assists in seven games and won a gold medal. He again represented the United States at the 2022 World Junior Ice Hockey Championships, where he appeared in one game before the tournament was canceled due to the COVID-19 pandemic.

On January 13, 2022, Faber was named to Team USA's roster to represent the United States at the 2022 Winter Olympics.

Career statistics

Regular season and playoffs

International

Awards and honors

References

External links
 

2002 births
Living people
Minnesota Golden Gophers men's ice hockey players
Los Angeles Kings draft picks
Ice hockey players from Minnesota
People from Maple Grove, Minnesota
USA Hockey National Team Development Program players
Ice hockey players at the 2022 Winter Olympics
Olympic ice hockey players of the United States